WTC, previously Westminster Theological Centre, is a British inter-denominational and charismatic theological college with its head offices in Cheltenham in England and learning centres throughout the United Kingdom.  

WTC delivers part-time courses in Kingdom theology at undergraduate and postgraduate levels which are validated by the University of Chester. Courses include the CertHE, BA(Hons), Graduate Diploma (also with vocational options in Student Ministry and Church Planting & Leadership) and MA. The courses are delivered through a blend of in-person teaching, web learning and video-conferencing making it possible for students to study university level theology around their everyday commitments. Locally, students study at local learning centres ("hubs") avoiding the isolation of traditional distance learning.

History
WTC began at St Mary's, Bryanston Square, Central London, in 2006, under the leadership of Crispin Fletcher-Louis and with the support of the Vicar of St Mary's (John Peters) and members of the church. Originally the college aimed to offer ordination courses to Anglican ordinands as well as theological study to lay students, with students remaining based in their home churches and contexts of influence.  
Under the leadership of Lucy Peppiatt, who became the second principal in 2013, the college was reoriented to serve, primarily, the independent church constituency in the UK who have no dedicated theological colleges. However, the student body is still drawn from a wide range of church affiliations including traditional denominations. Since 2013, WTC has also expanded its academic staff, the range of courses it offers and the number of Hubs (partnerships with local churches where students study locally). Currently, there are twelve hubs in the UK, including Northern Ireland and Scotland.

References

Bible colleges, seminaries and theological colleges in England
Education in Cheltenham